Birrong Girls High School is a government-funded single-sex comprehensive secondary day school for girls, located on Cooper Road, Birrong, a western suburb of Sydney, in New South Wales, Australia.

Established in 1957, the school enrolled approximately 790 students in 2018, from Year 7 to Year 12, of whom one percent identified as Indigenous Australians and 94 percent were from a language background other than English. The school is operated by the NSW Department of Education in accordance with a curriculum developed by the New South Wales Education Standards Authority; the principal is Zena Dabaja.

Overview 
The school was established on 29 January 1957 as Birrong Home Science School. It was officially reopened as a multi-lateral high school, with the new name Birrong Girls High School, on 25 September 1959.

Amongst its students there is a diverse range of cultural backgrounds representing 46 language groups, the majority of whom are from Arabic, Vietnamese, Chinese and Turkish backgrounds.

Notable alumni
 Lynda VoltzAustralian politician
 Helen WestwoodAustralian politician

See also 

 List of government schools in New South Wales
 List of girls' schools in New South Wales
 Education in Australia

References

External links
 

Public high schools in Sydney
School buildings completed in 1957
Girls' schools in New South Wales
Educational institutions established in 1957
1957 establishments in Australia